Stosch is a German surname. Notable people with the surname include:

Albrecht von Stosch (1818–1896), German general and admiral
Martin Stosch (born 1990), German singer
Philipp von Stosch (1691–1757), Prussian antiquarian
Walter Stosch (born 1936), American politician

See also
Stosch Island, island in the Patagonian Archipelago
SMS Stosch, Bismarck-class corvette built for the German Imperial Navy in the late 1870s

German-language surnames

de:Stosch